James S. Henry is an American economist, lawyer, and investigative journalist. He is an Edward R. Murrow Fellow at Tufts University's Fletcher School of Law and Diplomacy and an INSPIRE Fellow at its Institute for Global Leadership. Henry has written extensively on the problems of financial secrecy, capital flight, tax evasion, tax justice and developmental finance. Henry is, along with Nicholas Shaxson, a founding member and senior adviser of the Tax Justice Network.

Early life
Henry was born in Minneapolis, Minnesota, and has a bachelor's degree from Harvard College, a JD from Harvard Law School, and a master's degree from  Harvard Graduate School of Arts and Sciences.

Commentary
In August 2019, Henry tweeted that Joseph Kennedy III "should focus on his family’s considerable mental health issues". The tweet was retweeted by former Ed Markey aide Paul Tencher who, following an outcry, apologized for doing so, saying it had been an accidental retweet of a "despicable and abhorrent" post and that Henry should be "banned from Twitter".

Career
Before James wrote Blood Bankers and founded technology and IT consulting firm, Sag Harbour, James was chief economist at McKinsey & Co.

Publications
 The Blood Bankers: Tales from the Global Underground Economy (2005)
 Pirate Bankers: First-Hand Investigations of Private Banking, Capital Flight, Corruption, Money Laundering, Tax Evasion, Drug Trafficking, Organized Crime, Terror Banking, and the Continuing Global Development Crisis (2006)

Personal life
Henry and his family live in New York City and Sag Harbor, New York.

See also
Financial effect of tax havens

References

21st-century American economists
American lawyers
American investigative journalists
Living people
Harvard Law School alumni
Year of birth missing (living people)